Bergamot mint may refer to either of two fragrant herbs in the mint family, Lamiaceae:

Eau de Cologne mint, probably a cultivar of Mentha aquatica
Monarda didyma, an aromatic herb in the family Lamiaceae